Floyd is an unincorporated community in Washington County, in the U.S. state of Missouri.

History
A post office called Floyd was established in 1893, and remained in operation until 1932. The name "Floyd" was suggested by postal officials, and has no local significance.

References

Unincorporated communities in Washington County, Missouri
Unincorporated communities in Missouri